Gijs Damen (born 20 July 1979) is a retired Dutch swimmer. Between 2001 and 2005 he won one silver and three gold medals in the 4×50 m freestyle relay at the European Short Course Swimming Championships. While winning the 2003 title the Dutch team set a new world record.

He retired from competitive swimming in September 2006 and lives in Breda.

References

1979 births
Living people
Dutch male freestyle swimmers
Sportspeople from Breda